Hong Kong Children's Hospital is the first children hospital in Hong Kong's public healthcare system, located in Kowloon City, Hong Kong. Located at the south apron of the former Kai Tak Airport, the hospital has 468 beds for inpatients and day-patients, providing mainly tertiary services for complex and rare paediatric cases. Funded by the Hong Kong Government, construction of the HK$13 billion hospital began in August 2013. The hospital treats patients with a referral up to 19 years of age.

The hospital first focuses on cancer and kidney diseases in the first phase of operation in December 2018. Services currently available include oncology and haematology, nephrology, metabolic medicine, intensive care, paediatric surgery, pathology, anaesthesia, radiology, pharmacy and allied health services. Other clinical services will commence gradually.

History
The hospital, originally named the Centre of Excellence in Paediatrics, was first announced in the 2007 policy address given by Donald Tsang, the former Chief Executive of Hong Kong. The site chosen for the hospital used to be the headquarters of the Royal Hong Kong Auxiliary Air Force.

A design-and-build contract for the new hospital was awarded in July 2013 to a joint venture comprising Chinese state-owned contractor China State and Hong Kong firm Shui On Construction. The structural engineer was Meinhardt while the building services engineer was J. Roger Preston Limited. The architect was Simon Kwan and Associates. Construction began in August 2013.

In February 2014, the hospital was officially renamed Hong Kong Children's Hospital. It opened on 18 December 2018, initially offering paediatric haematology and oncology ward, paediatric intensive care unit and operating theatre services. The first inpatient services commenced on 27 March 2019, namely: the paediatric haematology and oncology ward, paediatric intensive care unit and operating theatre services.

Transport
Green Minibus

 Route 86 to Telford Plaza in Kowloon Bay
 Route 90A to Yai Lai Estate in Yau Tong
 Route 90B to Sau Mau Ping

Bus

 KMB Route 5R to Kwun Tong via Ngau Tau Kok
 Citybus Route 22 to Festival Walk in Kowloon Tong
 Citybus Route 22M to Prince Edward Road East in Kowloon City.

Rehabus Feeder Service

 The Hospital provides Rehabus feeder service for patients in need.

See also
 The Duchess of Kent Children's Hospital at Sandy Bay – another Hong Kong paediatric specialist hospital

References

External links

2018 establishments in Hong Kong
Children's hospitals in Hong Kong
Hospitals in Hong Kong
Kowloon City District